Ann Lloyd Keen (née Fox; born 26 November 1948) is a British Labour Party politician, who served as Member of Parliament (MP) for Brentford and Isleworth from 1997, until she was defeated by Conservative candidate Mary Macleod in 2010. In 1999, The Guardian newspaper revealed that she had acted as a "secret go-between" for the Labour Party and Shaun Woodward, at the time the MP for Witney, as he attempted to defect from the Conservative Party in the same year.

Early life
Keen is the daughter of steelworker John Lloyd Fox and Ruby Hughes. She went to Elfed Secondary Modern School in Buckley, Clwyd, then gained a PGCEA (Postgraduate Certificate in the Education of Adults) from the University of Surrey. She worked in the National Health Service (NHS) before training as a registered nurse at Ashford General Hospital in Ashford, Middlesex, and won prizes as Nurse of the Year and Children's Nurse of the Year. She later became a district nurse. From 1989 to 1993, she was Head of the Faculty of Advanced Nursing at Queen Charlotte's College in Hammersmith (now part of Thames Valley University) and she also served as General Secretary of the Community and District Nursing Association.

Parliamentary career
Keen stood for the Brentford & Isleworth seat in 1987 and 1992 though was unsuccessful on both occasions. For the 1997 election she was again selected, on this occasion through an all-women shortlist. This method of selection was declared unlawful in January 1996 as it breached sex discrimination laws. Despite the ruling she remained in place as the candidate for the 1997 general election, when she became an MP defeating Conservative MP Nirj Deva.

Keen's first role in Parliament came in 1999 when she was appointed as Parliamentary Private Secretary to Frank Dobson, Secretary of State for Health, though this appointment lasted less than a month. She then moved to the Treasury, later becoming Parliamentary Private Secretary to the then Chancellor of the Exchequer, Gordon Brown. In 2000 Keen became well known for campaigning on gay rights, her interest in the issue sparked when she was reunited with her gay son who she had given up for adoption. In the same year she also successfully ran a campaign to elect Michael Martin as Speaker to the House of Commons.

She was defeated at the 2010 general election by Conservative candidate Mary Macleod on a swing of 6%.

Health minister
Keen campaigned in parliament on health issues as a backbencher, and served on the health select committee. In 1998, Keen proposed an Early Day Motion calling for equitable care for women with ovarian cancer, which was supported by over 100 other MPs.

On 29 June 2007, in Brown's first reshuffle as Prime Minister she was promoted to become a Parliamentary Under Secretary of State in the Department of Health, where her brief included NHS dentistry.

In 2009–2010, Keen led the Prime Minister's independent commission on the future of nursing and midwifery in England, which resulted in the report "Front Line Care".

Policies

Heathrow Airport expansion
On 28 January 2009, Keen voted against a motion in Parliament calling for a review of the decision to add a third runway at Heathrow Airport. Keen had claimed to be opposed to expansion at Heathrow for many years; her website stated in 2007 that "one of her most successful campaigns was against the Third Runway at Heathrow." Friends of the Earth said she had "betrayed her constituents."

Expenses

Keen and her MP husband Alan Keen used their combined second homes allowances to buy an apartment in an up-market development at Waterloo on the South Bank of the River Thames, claiming £175,000 over five years. The Waterloo apartment is nine miles from their constituency home in Brentford, a 30-minute drive from Westminster. MPs who reside near the Keens in Brentford, such as Home Office Minister Phil Woolas who lives in the next street, are able to commute from there to Westminster. The couple claimed for both the interest payments on the Waterloo flat and the cost of re-mortgaging their Brentford home. The Fees Office agreed with the couple's argument that this was claimable because it was used to raise equity for the flat. The mortgage also included the cost of "compulsory" life insurance attached to the mortgages, a practice which is now banned. Their claims caused some newspapers to nickname the couple "Mr and Mrs Expenses". It is considered that the whole episode and the shame of it, cost the couple their political reputations and therefore became the eventual end of their political careers.

In 2009, their Brentford home was occupied by squatters after it was unoccupied for 9–12 months following a dispute with a building firm undertaking renovation work. The squatters' declared aim was to turn the house into a centre for war refugees, in response to Mrs Keen's support for the British invasion of Iraq.

In 2007–2008 Keen had previously hit the headlines having the highest expenses claim of any MP excluding transport costs (which disproportionately affect MPs from remote constituencies), claiming a total of £167,306 for the financial year. In total the Keens have claimed almost £1.7million in expenses over seven years.

In defending their part in the expenses scandal the Keens stated "we have advocated, strongly supported, and voted for the introduction of Freedom of Information legislation. We are pleased that the point has been reached when full details of MPs' expenses are being published on a regular basis for everyone to see". However, in November 2009, arsonists repeatedly attacked the offices of a nurses' organisation based at a property owned by the Brentford & Isleworth Constituency Labour Party, allegedly in reaction to the revelations over the MP's expense claims.

A formal investigation into the Keens' expenses by the Parliamentary Commissioner for Standards ruled in March 2010 that the Keens had breached the expenses rules and that he regarded the breach of the rules as "serious", and involving "significant public funds". He suggested that the Keens should pay back four months worth of their claims – some £5,678. However, The Commons Standards and Privileges Committee of MPs took the unusual step of disagreeing with his findings and slashing the repayment ordering them to repay £1,500.

Misuse of stationery
In May 2009 the Parliamentary ombudsman instructed Keen to repay £4,583 for sending unsolicited letters to her constituents. Keen invited them to coffee mornings using prepaid envelopes and on House of Commons headed stationery, a breach of Parliamentary rules as they are only permitted to be used for replies. Keen said the correspondence was sent by "a new member of staff ... on House of Commons instead of constituency stationery. When it was brought to my attention I immediately refunded the cost."

In April 2005 Keen also attracted criticism for using schools to distribute party political material to children's parents.

John Taylor's failed legal claim
In February 2009 constituent John Taylor alleged Keen had breached her 'duty of care' to a constituent in failing to assist his attempts in achieving compensation for wrongful imprisonment. Keen was initially ordered to pay £15,000 in damages by a judgment entered in default, but the ruling was later set aside, with the judge stating there was no entitlement in law for him to bring such a claim. Keen said, "As an MP I deal with huge numbers of cases each year for my constituents, many of which have successful outcomes. "Unfortunately, some cases for a variety of reasons do not have successful outcomes. Despite trying my hardest for Mr Taylor for more than 10 years since 1997, this was one such case." The case was believed to be the first of its kind.

Personal life
She married Alan Keen, who sat as a Labour MP from 1992 until his death in 2011, in 1980. Her sister, Sylvia Heal, also a former Labour MP, was one of three Deputy Speakers of the House of Commons under former Speaker Michael Martin. Keen has two sons and one daughter. She had one of her sons adopted and was reunited with him in 1997.

References

External links
Ann Keen MP official site
Guardian Unlimited Politics – Ask Aristotle: Ann Keen MP
TheyWorkForYou.com – Ann Keen MP
BBC Politics page 
 

1948 births
Living people
Academics of the University of West London
Alumni of the University of Surrey
British nurses
Labour Party (UK) MPs for English constituencies
Female members of the Parliament of the United Kingdom for English constituencies
People from Hawarden
UK MPs 1997–2001
UK MPs 2001–2005
UK MPs 2005–2010
20th-century British women politicians
21st-century British women politicians
20th-century English women
20th-century English people
21st-century English women
21st-century English people